The New Caledonia national handball team is the national handball team of New Caledonia. They have won the Oceania Handball Nations Cup in 2008 and have finished second in the Pacific Handball Cup twice.

Results

Oceania Nations Cup

Pacific Handball Cup

External links
IHF profile

Men's national handball teams